Lewis Elmer Worsham, Jr. (October 5, 1917 – October 19, 1990) was an American professional golfer, the U.S. Open champion

Life and career
Worsham was born on October 5, 1917, in Pittsylvania County, Virginia. He grew up in Long Island, Virginia. Worsham attended Hampton High School and was a member of the golf team from 1933 to 1935. He served in the United States Navy during World War II.

Worsham won the U.S. Open in 1947 by defeating Sam Snead by a stroke in an 18-hole playoff at the St. Louis Country Club in Clayton, Missouri. This was the first U.S. Open to be televised locally and the winner's share was $2,000. In July 1947, Worsham appeared on the cover of Golfing magazine. In 1953, he led the PGA Tour money list with $34,002 in earnings. That same year he won the first golf tournament to be broadcast nationally in the United States and golf's first $100,000 tournament, the Tam O'Shanter World Championship of Golf, in spectacular fashion. He holed out a wedge from 104 yards for an eagle-2 to win over Chandler Harper by 

Worsham made his only Ryder Cup appearance in 1947 and won both of his matches. Like most tour players of his generation, he earned his living primarily as a club professional, and was the longtime pro at Oakmont Country Club, northeast of Pittsburgh, 

Worsham was honored as the "Sportsperson of the Year" for 1953 by Pittsburgh's Dapper Dan Charities. He was inducted into the PGA of America Hall of Fame in 2017.

Personal life
Worsham married Virginia. He had one daughter and two sons: Lynda, Richard L and Thomas E.

Worsham died on October 19, 1990, at age, 73 in Poquoson, Virginia. He is buried at Columbia Gardens Cemetery in Arlington, Virginia.

Professional wins (13)

PGA Tour wins (6)
1946 Atlanta Invitational
1947 U.S. Open, Denver Open
1951 Phoenix Open
1953 Jacksonville Open, World Championship of Golf

Major championship is shown in bold.

Other wins (7)
1942 Middle Atlantic PGA Championship
1945 Maryland Open
1946 Middle Atlantic PGA Championship
1947 Middle Atlantic PGA Championship
1948 Cavalier Specialists Invitational
1952 Miami Beach International Four-Ball (with Ted Kroll)
1961 Tri-State PGA Championship

Major championships

Wins (1)

1 Defeated Snead in an 18-hole playoff - Worsham 69 (−2), Snead 70 (−1).

Results timeline

Note: Worsham never played in The Open Championship.

NT = No tournament
CUT = missed the half-way cut
WD = Withdrew
R64, R32, R16, QF, SF = Round in which player lost in PGA Championship match play
"T" = tied

Summary

Most consecutive cuts made – 12 (1946 U.S. Open – 1950 Masters)
Longest streak of top-10s – 3 (1948 U.S. Open – 1949 Masters)

References

American male golfers
PGA Tour golfers
Winners of men's major golf championships
Ryder Cup competitors for the United States
Golfers from Virginia
Golfers from Pittsburgh
American military personnel of World War II
People from Pittsylvania County, Virginia
1917 births
1990 deaths